James Chalmers Macadam (born 29 June 1988) is an English first-class cricketer.

Macadam was born at Paddington in June 1988. He was educated at Eton College, before going up to Keble College, Oxford to study geography. He played first-class cricket while studying at Oxford, making a single appearance each for Oxford University in The University Match against Cambridge University at Fenner's in 2007, before appearing for Oxford UCCE against Glamorgan at Oxford in 2008. He later studied for his MPhil at Downing College at the University of Cambridge.

Notes and references

External links

1988 births
Living people
People from Paddington
People educated at Eton College
Alumni of Keble College, Oxford
English cricketers
Oxford University cricketers
Oxford MCCU cricketers
Alumni of Downing College, Cambridge